The  is a tramcar type operated by Tokyo Metropolitan Bureau of Transportation (Toei) on the Toden Arakawa Line in Tokyo, Japan, since April 2009.

Operations
The fleet of ten cars is based at Arakawa Depot, and operates on the sole remaining tram line in Tokyo, the Toden Arakawa Line.

Liveries
The tramcars are finished in a white livery with coloured ends and a roofline stripe. The colours used on individual cars are as follows.

History
The first two cars, 8801 and 8802, entered revenue service on 26 April 2009. The last car built, yellow-liveried 8810, was delivered in December 2010.

Fleet build details
The individual car build histories are as follows.

References

External links

 Toden rolling stock 

Electric multiple units of Japan
Tokyo Metropolitan Bureau of Transportation
Train-related introductions in 2009
600 V DC multiple units
Alna Sharyo rolling stock